The population of Dubai is estimated to be 3.5 million as of April 2022 according to government data. , 3.2 million were non-Emirati, and 69% were male. About 58.50% of the population is concentrated in the 25-44 age group. This unnatural age and gender distribution is due to the large proportion of foreign workers, most of whom are working-age males. Life expectancy at birth was 81 years for males, and 82.1 for females.

Ethnic breakdown
Approximately 
67% of the expatriate population (and 71% of the emirate's total population) is South Asian. About 25% of the population have Iranian origin. About 8% of the total population of Dubai is categorized as "Western".  The median age in the emirate was about 27 years. In 2014, there were estimated to be 15.54 births and 1.99 deaths per 1,000 people.

Culture

Dubai has diverse cultures all present at the same time in the city. There is no dominant culture that is associated with a particular ethnicity.

Languages spoken
Dubai's official language is Arabic, but English is the lingua franca and is far more commonly used than any other language in the daily communications between the city's residents.

Religion

Article 7 of the UAE's Provisional Constitution declares Islam the official state religion of the Union. The Government funds or subsidizes almost 95 percent of Sunni mosques and employs all Sunni imams; approximately 5 percent of Sunni mosques are entirely private, and several large mosques have large private endowments. Shias are 15% of UAE's native population. The Shi'a minority is free to worship and maintain its own mosques. Shi'a Muslims in Dubai may pursue Shi'a family law cases through a special Shi'a council rather than the Shari'a courts.

Dubai has large expatriate communities of Hindus, Christians, Buddhists, Sikhs and others. Non-Muslim groups can own their own houses of worship, wherein they can practice their religion freely, by requesting a land grant and permission to build a compound. Groups that do not have their own buildings must use the facilities of other religious organizations or worship in private homes. While the UAE does not offer any federal-level method of granting official status to religious groups, the individual emirates may exercise autonomy in officially recognizing a particular religious denomination. For instance, Dubai granted legal status to the Church of Jesus Christ of Latter-day Saints in 1993. Dubai is also the only emirate that has Hindu temples and a Sikh Gurdwara.

In early 2001, ground was broken for the construction of several additional churches on a parcel of land in Jebel Ali donated by the government of Dubai to four Protestant congregations and a Roman Catholic congregation. Construction on the first Greek Orthodox Church in Dubai (to be called St. Mary's) began at the end of 2005. The land for the construction of the church was also donated by the government to the Greek Orthodox community of Dubai.

Financial support to non-Muslim groups from the Dubai government is limited to donated land for the construction of churches and other religious facilities, including cemeteries. They are permitted to raise money from among their congregates and to receive financial support from abroad. Non-Muslim religious groups are permitted to openly advertise group functions.

References

External links
Dubai Statistics Center, the government statistics agency

Geography of Dubai
Dubai
Dubai